Juab is a ghost town in Juab County, Utah, United States.

History
Juab was originally called Chicken Creek, and under the latter name was settled in 1860.

Juab was a railroad station and was the end of the line of the Union Pacific Railroad subsidiary, the Utah Southern Railroad in 1879. The rails were advanced to Milford in 1880 by the Utah Southern Railroad Extension. By the end of the century, the rails and station were part of the Oregon Short Line Railroad, a larger Union Pacific Railroad subsidiary. In 1903, the rails and station became part of the San Pedro, Los Angeles and Salt Lake Railroad.

See also

References

External links

Ghost towns in Utah
Ghost towns in Juab County, Utah
Provo–Orem metropolitan area
Populated places established in 1879
1879 establishments in Utah Territory
Former railway stations in Utah